The Swarthmore Garnet Tide represented Swarthmore College in the sport of college football.  Swarthmore was the 15th school to play football.

The football team was controversially eliminated in 2000, along with wrestling and, initially, badminton. The Board of Managers cited lack of athletes on campus and difficulty of recruiting as reasons for terminating the programs.

References

 
1879 establishments in Pennsylvania
2000 disestablishments in Pennsylvania
American football teams established in 1879
American football teams disestablished in 2000